You Turn My Life Around is the first solo studio album released by Charlie Wilson. It was released on July 21, 1992 from Bon Ami Records, through a production and distribution agreement with the then called MCA Records. The album peaked at #42 on Billboard's R&B Album chart when it was released in 1992. First single was the New Jack Swing patterned "Sprung On Me".

Track listing

Charts

References

External links
 
 You Turn My Life Around at Discogs
 Official website
 Facebook Page
 My Space Page
 Charlie Wilson in-depth interview by Pete Lewis, 'Blues & Soul' August 2011

1992 debut albums
Charlie Wilson (singer) albums
MCA Records albums